The Power A5000 was a planned Amiga clone computer, announced by German DCE Computer Service GmbH and British Amiga peripherals manufacturer Power Computing Ltd. (Not to be confused with Power Computing Apple clone manufacturer). It was one of the first Amiga clone computers announced after Gateway purchased the Amiga in 1997.

The original Motorola 680x0 based system was revised in favor of the PowerPC G3 based system, since the future for the Amigas with 680x0 processors was very uncertain. In 1999, the A5000 was cancelled due to delay of hardware components and announcements of the new Amiga system Amiga Multimedia Convergence Computer (Amiga MCC) by Amiga, Inc.

Technical information

Original specifications
Motherboard: Baby AT-size 100% Amiga-compatible 
CPU: Motorola 68030/50 MHz or 68040
Chipset: AGA
Drives:
1.44 MB floppy drive
1.7 GB IDE hard drive
10 - 24 speed IDE CD-ROM
Expansion:
Dual IDE interface
4 Zorro III slots
A bus slot for the addition of accelerators and MPEG card
Additional:
MPEG level 1 supported
PC or Amiga keyboard
A scan doubler for use with cheap PC monitors
Possible addition of PowerPC interface

Revised specifications
PowerPC G3 compatibility through Escena Brainstormer G3
68k emulation
WarpUp PPC software
A1200 accelerator slot compatible
Flicker Fixer
3x Active PCI slots
ATX motherboard
2x A4000-style videoslots
Connector for Zorro II backplane

See also

 Amiga Walker
 Amiga models and variants

References

Amiga